The NASA Acquisition Internet Service (NAIS) is a service provided by the NASA in order to disseminate information about NASA procurements. NAIS has been hailed by the GAO as "an effective mechanism for disseminating procurement information to industry, including small businesses."

References

External links 
 NASA Acquisition Internet Service

NASA online
Government procurement in the United States
Government databases in the United States